Yoda1 is a chemical compound which is the first agonist developed for the mechanosensitive ion channel PIEZO1. This protein is involved in regulation of blood pressure and red blood cell volume, and Yoda1 is used in scientific research in these areas.

See also
 Jedi1 and Jedi2

References

Thioethers
Pyrazines
Thiadiazoles
Chloroarenes